This article lists some notable people who were imprisoned at Theresienstadt Ghetto.

Notable prisoners who died at the camp
Esther Adolphine, sister of Sigmund Freud (died 29 September 1942)
Alice Archenhold and Hilde Archenhold, wife and daughter of astronomer Friedrich Simon Archenhold
Eugen Burg, German film actor (died 17 April 1944)
Paul Nikolaus Cossmann, editor of the conservative Süddeutsche Monatshefte (died 19 October 1942)
Ludwig Chodziesner, German lawyer and father of poet Gertrud Kolmar (died February 1943)
Ludwig Czech, chairman of the German Social Democratic Party in pre-war Czechoslovakia and former Czechoslovak minister of Social Care, Public Affairs and Public Health (died 20 August 1942)
Robert Desnos, French Surrealist poet (died 8 June 1945)
Oskar Fischer, physician (died of a heart attack on 28 February 1942)
Alfred Flatow, German Olympic gymnast, 1896 Olympics gold medallist (died 28 December 1942)
Gabriel Frankl (born in Pohořelice in 1861), father of Viktor Frankl (died 13 February 1943, from pneumonia and starvation).
Gisela Januszewska, physician (died 2 March 1943)
Rudolf Karel, Czech composer (died 6 March 1945) 
Emil Kolben, Czech industrialist (founder of ČKD), one of the founders of industrial use of electricity (died 3 September 1943)
Clementine Krämer, writer and social worker (died 4 November 1942)
Gretchen Metzger (née Guldmann), mother of Otto Metzger (died 28 February 1943)
Friedrich Münzer, German classical scholar (died 20 October 1942)
Margarethe "Trude" Neumann (born 1893), daughter of Theodor Herzl (died 1943)
, German Jewish refugee who lived in the Secret Annex with Anne Frank. (It is believed that she died during an evacuation transport of prisoners from Raguhn, a subcamp of Buchenwald to Theresienstadt), (died April 1945)
Georg Alexander Pick, Austrian mathematician, creator of Pick's theorem (died 26 July 1942 after two weeks' imprisonment)
Ludwig Pick, German pathologist after whom Niemann-Pick disease and Lubarsch-Pick syndrome are named (died 3 February 1944)
Samuel Schallinger, Austrian businessman, co-owner of the Imperial and the Bristol hotels in Vienna (died 1942)
Margarete Schiff, daughter of psychotherapist Josef Breuer (died 9 September 1942)
Zikmund Schul, composer (died 2 June 1944)
 (née Buch), a noted painter and sculptor (died 10 August 1944)
Mathilde Sussin, actress (died 2 August 1943)
Alfred Tauber, Austrian and Slovak mathematician (died 26 July 1942)
Ernestine Taube, mother of pianist/composer Artur Schnabel, remained in Vienna after the Anschluss and at the age of 83, in August 1942, was deported to Theresienstadt concentration camp, where she died two months later.
Josefine Winter, daughter of Helene and Rudolf Auspitz

Notable survivors
H. G. Adler, German-speaking writer and scholar
Karel Ančerl, Czech conductor
Inge Auerbacher, author of 6 books (including three memoirs about her experiences in Terezin and recovering after the war), and the subject of a new play, The Star on My Heart (November 2015)
Yehuda Bacon, Israeli artist
Leo Baeck, German rabbi
Aviva Bar-On has lived in Israel since 1949. She is known to have sung in 2018, during a concert celebrating Independence Day in Jerusalem, one of the poet Ilse Weber's songs that was transmitted to her orally and her memory was the only record.
Elsa Bernstein, Austrian-German playwright
Ilse Blumenthal-Weiss, German poet
Ellen Burka, Dutch-Canadian figure skater and coach
 Bela Dekany, Hungarian Jewish-born renowned British violinist and leader of the BBC Symphony Orchestra
Arthur Eichengrün, German chemist who invented anti-gonorrhoea drug Protargol
Kurt Epstein, Czech Olympic water polo competitor
Emil František Burian, Czech communist playwright, actor, composer and writer
Viktor Frankl, Austrian neurologist and psychologist
Jaro Fürth, Austrian actor
 Petr Ginz, Czech child prodigy writer, died in Auschwitz in 1944
Richard Glazar and Karel Unger, they were subsequently transferred to Treblinka, from which they ultimately escaped
Michael Gruenbaum, writer
Alena Hájková, Czech historian and resistance fighter
Alice Herz-Sommer, Czech pianist; the focus of the documentary The Lady in Number 6. Died at 110 years old on 23 February 2014, oldest known survivor of the Holocaust.
 Fredy Hirsch, deputy leader of the children at Theresienstadt, deported 8 September 1943 to Auschwitz and died 8 March 1944
Milada Horáková, Czech politician
Berthold Jeiteles, scientist, Talmudic scholar, and descendant of notable Prague family
Ivan Klíma, Czech novelist
Egon Lánský, Czech journalist and politician of Slovak origin
Gidon Lev, Czech-born Israeli TikTok star and Holocaust educator
Arnošt Lustig, Czech novelist
Paul Mahrer, professional soccer player (died 1984)
Ferdinand Münz (1888-1969), chemist. The inventor of EDTA.
Oskar Neumann, Czech lawyer and former president of the Slovak Jewish Council
Arnošt Reiser, professor of chemistry, author and inventor
Zuzana Růžičková, Czech harpsichordist
Jo Spier, illustrator
Peter Spier, Author and illustrator of children's books
Sam Swaap, Dutch violinist and conductor
Emil Utitz, German-language academic 
Ronald Waterman 
 Ela Weissberger, the Cat in Brundibár (performed in schools around the world in memory of the children who did not survive)

References

German military-related lists
Lists of Nazi concentration camps
Lists of prisoners and detainees
Prisoners 
Germany in World War II-related lists